After the Gig: How the Sharing Economy Got Hijacked and How to Win It Back is a 2020 book by Juliet Schor.

Bibliography

External links 

 

2020 non-fiction books
English-language books
University of California Press books
Labor history of the United States
Books about labour
Books by Juliet Schor